Thomas Rowley may refer to:
Thomas Rowley (headmaster) (1797–1877), headmaster of Bridgnorth Grammar School
Thomas Rowley (poet) (1721–1796), Vermont poet
Thomas Rowley (runholder) (died 1903), New Zealand member of Parliament for Ellesmere
Thomas Rowley (settler) (1612–1628), Newfoundland, Canada
Thomas Rowley (soldier) (1748–1806), Australian soldier and landowner
Thomas Algeo Rowley (1808–1892), Union Army general in the American Civil War
Thomas Rowley (skier), American freestyle skier
the pseudonym of Thomas Chatterton (1752–1770), English poet and forger of pseudo-medieval poetry